Richard "Jerry" Raymond (July 14, 1928 – February 19, 2018) was an American football coach. He served as the head football coach at Eastern Michigan University in Ypsilanti, Michigan from 1965 to 1966, compiling a record of 8–7–2.

Head coaching record

References

1928 births
2018 deaths
Eastern Michigan Eagles football coaches